Sari Miriam Essayah (born 21 February 1967 in Haukivuori) is a Finnish retired racewalker and a politician, former Member of the European Parliament (MEP) and Member of Parliament since 2015. She is the president of the Finnish Christian Democrats party. Her father is from Morocco.

During her sports career, Essayah competed mainly in 5 000 and 10 000 metres. In the latter, she won the World Championship in 1993 and the European Championship in 1994. She made seven national records, all of which are still standing.

In 2016, Essayah became a member of the International Olympic Committee (IOC), and she has been a member of the Ethics Committee, Finnish Athletics Association since 2014.

Education
Essayah holds an M.Sc (Econ) in business administration and accounting from the University of Vaasa.

Political career
After retiring from sports Essayah entered politics and represented the Christian Democrats in the Finnish parliament between 2003–2007 but failed to get reelected in the election of 2007. She served as the Christian Democrats' party secretary from 2007 to 2009. Essayah was elected to the European Parliament in 2009 but failed to be reelected in 2014 despite her 61 000 votes. This left the Finnish Christian Democrats without MEPs in the 2014 election. In November 2011 she undertook godparenthood for Mikola Dziadok, Belarusian activist and political prisoner.

Essayah was candidate in the 2012 Finnish presidential election. She came last with 2.47 percent of the votes.

In the 2015 parliamentary elections, Essayah was elected to represent a newly formed constituency of Savonia and Karelia with over 11 000 votes. She was later chosen to be the vice speaker of the Christian Democrats' Parliamentary group. In August, she was chosen as the new chair of her party after her predecessor, Päivi Räsänen, retired from the position after over ten years. Sari Essayah was re-elected in Finnish parliament in the 2019 elections and re-elected for a third term as the party chair in a party congress in August.

Other activities
 Finnish Institute of International Affairs (FIIA), Member of the Advisory Council (since 2019)

Achievements

References

External links

Sari Essayah website

|-

|-

1967 births
Living people
People from Mikkeli
Finnish Pentecostals
Finnish evangelists
Finnish people of Moroccan descent
Leaders of political parties in Finland
Christian Democrats (Finland) politicians
Members of the Parliament of Finland (2003–07)
Members of the Parliament of Finland (2015–19)
Members of the Parliament of Finland (2019–23)
Christian Democrats (Finland) MEPs
MEPs for Finland 2009–2014
21st-century women MEPs for Finland
Candidates for President of Finland
Finnish sportsperson-politicians
Finnish female racewalkers
Athletes (track and field) at the 1992 Summer Olympics
Athletes (track and field) at the 1996 Summer Olympics
Olympic athletes of Finland
World Athletics Championships medalists
European Athletics Championships medalists
International Olympic Committee members
Universiade medalists in athletics (track and field)
Women members of the Parliament of Finland
Goodwill Games medalists in athletics
Universiade gold medalists for Finland
Universiade bronze medalists for Finland
World Athletics Championships winners
Medalists at the 1989 Summer Universiade
Medalists at the 1991 Summer Universiade
Competitors at the 1994 Goodwill Games